Whitford station is a commuter rail and former intercity passenger rail station located in the western suburbs of Philadelphia at South Whitford Road and Spackman Lane, Exton, Pennsylvania. It is served by most SEPTA Paoli/Thorndale Line trains and until 1998 some of Amtrak's Keystone Service trains.

Whitford Flyover
Whitford station is best known for the abandoned railway bridge that sits directly above the station site. The current station sits along the once-busy former Pennsylvania Railroad (PRR) four-track Main Line, which, in its prime, hosted a constant flow of commuter and long distance trains. To circumvent constant bottlenecks near Philadelphia, the PRR constructed a low-grade double-track electrified line in 1906 to host its freight traffic. This was done to bypass the steep grades and busy Philadelphia suburbs. Known as the Philadelphia and Thorndale Branch, the line ran alongside the current Paoli/Thorndale Line, crossing (or "flying") over it via a massive truss directly above the Whitford station. After the sharp decline in rail traffic in the 1970s, the freight line was abandoned outright by Conrail in 1989. In addition, the current passenger line was reduced from four tracks to three in the 1960s.

In its heyday, the PRR produced a series of calendars that included paintings of scenes throughout the extensive rail system. Artist Grif Teller captured a busy moment at Whitford in his "Main Lines—Freight and Passenger" painting from 1949, when the overhead trestle was still in use.

Current station
On August 2, 1984, the station house was listed on the National Register of Historic Places. There is no ticket office at the station. There are 229 parking spaces at the station for daily parking, some of which sit on the abandoned freight line that crosses over the station site.

This station is 28.7 track miles from Philadelphia's Suburban Station. In 2017, the average total weekday boardings at this station was 408, and the average total weekday alightings was 420.

Station layout
Whitford has two low-level side platforms. A center track is not used for passenger service.

References

External links

Historic American Engineering Record (HAER) No. PA-522, "Pennsylvania Railroad, Whitford Bridge"
SEPTA - Whitford Station

SEPTA Regional Rail stations
Former Pennsylvania Railroad stations
Railway stations on the National Register of Historic Places in Pennsylvania
Railway stations in the United States opened in 1880
1880 establishments in Pennsylvania
Former Amtrak stations in Pennsylvania
Railway stations in Chester County, Pennsylvania
National Register of Historic Places in Chester County, Pennsylvania
Philadelphia to Harrisburg Main Line